Børge Johan Schultz (1764-1826) was a Norwegian official who served as Royal Inspector of North Greenland from 1790 to 1797.

Born in Ringsaker to a middle-class family, Schultz studied law at the University of Copenhagen, where he graduated in 1788. In 1790, he was appointed as inspector of North Greenland upon the resignation of his predecessor, Jens Clausen Wille, who left the colony due to its disorganized state. During his tenure as inspector, Schultz encountered numerous problems in the colony, including disease and famine caused by English overfishing.

In 1796, he passed a law allowing European settlers and Greenlandic Inuit to marry.

He requested dismissal in 1796, which was granted the following year. He returned to Norway, where he was appointed Vogt of Østre Toten. He died in 1826, at the age of 62.

See also
 List of inspectors of Greenland

References 

1764 births
1826 deaths
Inspectors of Greenland
19th-century Norwegian people
History of the Arctic